is a Buddhist temple located in the city of Ichikawa in Chiba Prefecture. Kamei-in is a Nichiren Buddhist temple noted for the Mama Well.

History 
Kamei-in was built early in the Edo period in 1635 as a retirement temple for the 11th abbot of nearby Guhō-ji. Kamei-in is located directly to the southeast of the Guhō-ji, and remains a sub-temple of it. It was originally called Bin'i-bō. In 1705 an administrator from the Tokugawa shogunate, Nagayori Suzuki, began a restoration of Kame-in using stones from Nikkō Tōshō-gū, in Nikkō, Tochigi Prefecture. The stones were used to build the steps of Kamei-in. Suzuki was censured by the shogunate and committed seppuku over the incident. During this period the temple came to be known as Suzuki-in, but after Nagayori's death the name fell out of use. After the appearance of a mysterious turtle at Kamei-in, the temple came to be known by its current name, a combination of the kanji for turtle (亀) and well (井). Noted early 20th century tanka poet Hakushū Kitahara (1885 – 1942) lived in the monk's quarters of Kamei-in in 1916.

Mama Well 

The Mama Well of Kamei-in is referenced in a poem in the Man'yōshū. Takahashi Mushimaro, a low-ranking court official of the Nara period, wrote in the early 8th century poem On the maiden of Mama of Katsushika:
When I see the well at Mama of Katsushika,
It reminds me of Tekona
Who stood here oft, drawing water.

Related places 
 Guhō-ji
 Kamei-in faces the Monument and Shrine of Tekona, a temple featured in Hiroshige's One Hundred Famous Views of Edo

Transportation 
Kamei-in is located in the Mama District of Ichikawa. It is accessible by foot from the Kōnodai Station on Keisei Electric Railway's Keisei Main Line.

References 

Religious organizations established in the 17th century
Nichiren-shū temples
Buddhist temples in Ichikawa, Chiba
Ichikawa, Chiba